FRM Nazmul Ahasan (15 February 1955 – 4 February 2022) was a Bangladeshi lawyer and Judge of the Appellate Division of Bangladesh Supreme Court.

Early life 
Ahasan was born on 15 February 1955, in Pakistan. After finishing his masters he completed his law degree.

Career 
On 18 March 1986, Ahasan started working as a lawyer in the District Courts.

Ahasan became a lawyer in the High Court Division on 22 January 1994 and on 13 December 2009 the Appellate Division. He was a member of the Central Committee of Communist Party of Bangladesh.

On 18 April 2010, Ahasan was appointed an additional judge in the High Court Division and became a full judge on 15 April 2012.

On 29 August 2019, Ahasan and Justice K. M. Kamrul Kader issued a ruling that mandated portraits of Sheikh Mujibur Rahman be placed in all courtrooms of Bangladesh.

Ahasan and Justice K. M. Kamrul Kader issued a ruling on 15 February 2020 that asked the government to make 7 March the "historic national day"  commemorating the historic 7 March Speech of Bangabandhu Sheikh Mujibur Rahman.

Ahasan and Justice K. M. Kamrul Kader issued a ruling on 10 March 2020 that declared the national slogan of Bangladesh to be Joy Bangla.

On 8 December 2020, Ahasan and Justice Shahed Nuruddin issued an order asking the government to provide protection to monuments of President Sheikh Mujibur Rahman.

Ahasan was made a Judge of the Appellate Division of Bangladesh Supreme Court on 9 January 2022. He was one month away from retirement on 15 February 2022 when he was promoted.

Death 
Ahasan died from complications of COVID-19 at Bangabandhu Sheikh Mujib Medical University Hospital on 4 February 2022, at the age of 66.

Bangladesh Supreme Court suspended all activities of the court on 6 February 2022, in remembrance of Ahasan.

References 

1955 births
2022 deaths
20th-century Bangladeshi lawyers
Supreme Court of Bangladesh justices
Deaths from the COVID-19 pandemic in Bangladesh
Communist Party of Bangladesh politicians
21st-century Bangladeshi judges